Zografos or Zographos (painter) is a Greek surname. Notable people with the surname include:

  (1844-1927), Greek MP and academic, after whom the Athens suburb is named
 Christakis Zografos (1820-1898), Ottoman Greek banker and benefactor
 Georgios Christakis-Zografos or Georgios Zografos (1863-1920), his son, Greek politician and president of the Autonomous Republic of Northern Epirus
 Zografeion Lyceum, Greek school in Istanbul, Turkey, named after its benefactor Christakis Zografos
 Zographeion College, former educational institution  in Northern Epirus (today in Albania), named after its benefactor Christakis Zografos
 Saint Lazarus Zographos (died 867), Byzantine monk and painter
 Panagiotis Zographos, Greek painter of the Greek War of Independence
 Giorgos Zographos (1936–2005), Greek actor and singer 
  (1796-1856), Greek physician, politician and diplomat, who took part in the 3 September 1843 Revolution
 , Greek judge linked to the Trial of the Six (1922)
 , Greek swimmer and athlete, active in the early 20th century, member of the Aris Water Polo Club
 , Greek swimmer and athlete, active in the early 20th century, member of the Aris Water Polo Club
 Christoforos Zografos (born 1969), Greek football referee
 , Greek-American industrial designer

See also 
 Zografou (disambiguation)
 Zograf (disambiguation)

Greek-language surnames
Surnames